Jim Waring (born 27 December 1967) is an American politician, who served as state senator for seven years in the Arizona State Senate and now represents District 2 on the Phoenix City Council.

A Republican, he represented State Legislative District 7, covering parts of Phoenix, Scottsdale, Cave Creek and Carefree.  First elected in 2002, Waring was re-elected by large majorities in 2004, 2006 and 2008.  He served as a delegate to the Republican National Convention in 2008, and ran for Congress in 2010.

Early life and education
A native of Downers Grove, Illinois, he received his undergraduate degree from Northern Illinois University in DeKalb, Illinois, as well as a M.A. in Political Science, a Masters in Public Administration, and a PhD in Public Administration from Arizona State University, having written a dissertation on education finance.  He was a member of the Pi Kappa Alpha Fraternity.

Political career

Arizona State Senate
During his time at the legislature, Waring was known for his work on veterans issues (selected American Legion Legislator of the Year, National Guard Association of Arizona Senator of the Year three times, presented the Copper Shield award by the Arizona Veterans Hall of Fame and awarded the Medal of Merit by the National Guard Association of the United States), his fiscal conservatism (selected Champion of the Taxpayer, Guardian of Small Business by NFIB and Arizona Chamber of Commerce and Industry Senator of the Year by the Arizona Chamber of Commerce and Industry) and efforts to protect victims of domestic violence.  He was Chairman of the Senate Finance Committee, Chairman of the Senate Government Committee and Vice Chairman of the Senate Appropriations Committee.

Phoenix City Council
Councilman Jim Waring was sworn in as the District 2 Phoenix City Council representative on 7 Sept. 2011.

Campaign for Congress 2010
Following the announcement that John Shadegg would not stand for re-election in 2010, Waring resigned his State Senate seat to run for the U.S. House of Representatives in Arizona's 3rd congressional district.  Waring lost in a 10-candidate Republican primary on 24 August to Ben Quayle, son of former Vice President Dan Quayle, by 4.5% or roughly 3,500 votes out of over 79,000 votes cast.

Electoral history

Phoenix City Council, District 2

2013 Election

2011 Election

Congress, Arizona's 3rd Congressional District
2010 U.S. House, Arizona District 3 Primary Election

Arizona State Senate, District 7

2008 Primary

2008 General

2006 Primary

2006 General

2004 Primary

2004 General

2002 Primary

2002 General

Personal life

Jim and his wife, Kitty, are the parents of twin boys.

References

External links

Official Senate Profile
 Jim Waring for Congress

1967 births
Republican Party Arizona state senators
Living people
21st-century American politicians
Arizona city council members
Candidates in the 2010 United States elections
People from Downers Grove, Illinois
Northern Illinois University alumni
Arizona State University alumni